Alicante is a medium sized red variety of tomato. It is resistant to "greenback," a condition in which the fruit fails to ripen evenly, and produces a reliable, heavy, early crop.

References

Tomato cultivars